Closer is the second studio album by vocalist Josh Groban, released in November 2003. Much like his first studio album, half of this album's songs are sung in English, with the remainder sung in various other languages (Italian, Spanish and French). Closer was the top selling classical album of the 2000s in the US, according to Nielsen SoundScan.

The album debuted at No. 4 on the Billboard 200 albums chart, selling about 375,000 copies in its first week. In January 2004, the album rose from #11 to No. 1 in its ninth week on the chart, selling about 110,000 copies that week. This followed a sales campaign by Target.

In Australia, Closer reached a peak position of #25 on the ARIA Albums Chart of Australia. On June 13, 2007, it re-entered the chart at No. 39. As of October 2015, the album has sold over 6.1 million copies in the US. The track, "You Raise Me Up", charted at No. 73 on the Billboard Hot 100 and #1 on the Adult Contemporary chart. The track, "Remember When It Rained", reached No. 15 on the AC chart.

Track listing

Notes
  signifies an additional producer
  signifies a co-producer

TV appearances
 Good Morning America – November 11, 2003 
 The View – November 13, 2003

Charts

Weekly charts

Year-end charts

Certifications

References

External links
 
 

2004 albums
Josh Groban albums
Albums produced by David Foster
Reprise Records albums
Warner Records albums